A Quiet Place is a 2018 American post-apocalyptic science fiction horror film directed by John Krasinski and written by Scott Beck and Bryan Woods and Krasinski, from a story conceived by Woods and Beck. The plot revolves around a father (Krasinski) and a mother (Emily Blunt) who struggle to survive and rear their children (Millicent Simmonds and Noah Jupe) in a post-apocalyptic world inhabited by blind extraterrestrial creatures with an acute sense of hearing.

Beck and Woods began developing the story while in college. In July 2016, Krasinski read their spec script and was hired to direct and rewrite the script in March the following year. Krasinski and Blunt were cast in the lead roles in May 2017. Filming took place in upstate New York from May to November 2017.

A Quiet Place premiered at South by Southwest on March 9, 2018, and was released in the United States on April 6, 2018, by Paramount Pictures. It grossed more than $350 million worldwide and received critical acclaim. The film was chosen by the National Board of Review and American Film Institute as one of the top ten films of 2018. It was nominated for several awards, including the Golden Globe Award for Best Original Score, Academy Award for Best Sound Editing, Writers Guild of America Award for Best Original Screenplay, and Blunt won the Screen Actors Guild Award for Outstanding Performance by a Female Actor in a Supporting Role.

A sequel, A Quiet Place Part II, premiered in New York City on March 8, 2020 and was released in the United States on May 28, 2021, with Krasinski returning as director and the main cast also returning with the addition of Cillian Murphy. A spinoff, titled A Quiet Place: Day One and a threequel: A Quiet Place Part III are  scheduled for March 8 in 2024 and 2025, respectively.

Plot
Sightless aliens with sharp hearing and impenetrable armor plating have taken over the planet and killed most of the human population. The Abbott family — mother Evelyn, father Lee, deaf daughter Regan, and sons Marcus and Beau — live on their isolated farm in the middle of a forest in upstate New York, and have survived by taking precautions such as laying sand paths to avoid stepping on crunching leaves and using American Sign Language when communicating.

When the family goes into the nearby town for supplies, Beau finds a toy space shuttle, but Lee makes him leave it behind due to the noise it would make if powered on. As they are getting ready to leave, Regan secretly gives him back the toy, but without its batteries. When they leave, Beau takes back the batteries without anyone noticing. While walking back home, Beau turns on the space shuttle, which starts making noise. Almost immediately, Beau is killed by a nearby creature.

Over a year after Beau's death, the family has seemingly gone back to normal, with Evelyn several months pregnant. Marcus reluctantly goes fishing with Lee while Regan, upset that she cannot go, visits Beau's grave. While everybody is gone, Evelyn goes into labor; while going downstairs, she steps on a nail and drops a photo frame, which alerts nearby creatures. She flips a switch, turning the surrounding lights around the house red. She tries to go upstairs but finds out that one of the creatures has entered the house. Soon after, it enters the basement; Evelyn sets an egg timer, distracting the creature and giving herself time to run upstairs. She begins giving birth in the bathtub upstairs as the creature slowly makes its way towards her. Lee and Marcus return and set off fireworks as a diversion.

Regan, seeing the fireworks, runs back to the house. Lee then enters the house and brings the baby and Evelyn into a hiding spot under the floor in the barn outside. The baby cries, alerting a creature into the barn. This creature fails to find the source, but breaks some water pipes. Marcus and Regan go to the top of a grain silo and light a signal fire to other distant farms. Meanwhile, Evelyn wakes up in the flooded hideout with the creature still inside. She hides behind the falling water to mask her sound as the creature moves toward her.

After Marcus and Regan get into an argument, Marcus falls through the silo's roof, and Regan jumps in after him. The creature in the hideout runs towards the silo and attacks Regan and Marcus. The creature's disruptive effect on electronics causes Regan's cochlear implant to emit a high pitched noise and causes the creature to reel in pain before it runs off, breaking a hole in the silo. Lee finds Regan and Marcus, and tells them to get in his truck and use it to get back to the house. A creature then appears, attacks Lee, and wounds him; Marcus screams inside the truck, turning the creature's attention to them. Lee, realizing that his children are about to die unless he intervenes, signs to Regan that he loves her before yelling out. The creature then charges at Lee and kills him, giving Regan and Marcus time to get in the truck and roll it back to the house.

Back at the house, the children are greeted by Evelyn and they embrace. After hearing a nearby creature shriek, they retreat to the basement, where Regan sees that Lee had been studying cochlear implants to help her hear. A creature then comes into the basement. Remembering what had happened in the silo, Regan takes off her cochlear implant and slams it on a microphone. The resulting noise makes the creature shriek in pain and open the chitinous armor on its head, exposing the vulnerable inner tissue and allowing Evelyn to kill it with a shotgun. With Marcus and the baby hiding in the corner of the basement, Regan and Evelyn look on the screens connected to the security cameras and see two other creatures running towards the house. Regan turns up the wattage and lifts the microphone. Evelyn looks at Regan, smiles, and cocks her shotgun.

Cast

 Emily Blunt as Evelyn Abbott, wife of Lee, and the mother to their four children, Regan, Marcus, Beau, and baby Abbott. Krasinski said her character wanted to ensure that their children "be fully-formed, fully-thinking people."
 John Krasinski as Lee Abbott, an engineer who is Evelyn's husband and the father of Regan, Marcus, Beau, and newborn baby Abbott. Krasinski described his character as a survivalist focused on getting his family through each day.
 Krasinski also provided the motion-capture for the extraterrestrial creatures.
 Noah Jupe as Marcus Abbott, the second child and eldest son of Lee and Evelyn, and Regan's and Beau's brother. Krasinski noticed Jupe in the 2016 miniseries The Night Manager and watched an early screening of the 2017 film Suburbicon to evaluate Jupe's performance.
 Millicent Simmonds as Regan Abbott, Lee and Evelyn's teenage deaf daughter, and Marcus' and Beau's older sister. Krasinski said he sought a deaf actress "...for many reasons; I didn't want a non-deaf actress pretending to be deaf ... a deaf actress would help my knowledge and my understanding of the situations tenfold. I wanted someone who lives it and who could teach me about it on set."
 Cade Woodward as Beau Abbott, Lee and Evelyn's four-year-old son.
 Leon Russom as a man in the woods.

Production

Development and writing
A Quiet Place is a production of Platinum Dunes produced on a budget of $17 million. Krasinski wrote the screenplay with Scott Beck and Bryan Woods. Beck and Woods grew up together in Iowa and had watched numerous silent films in college, and they began working on the story that led to the film. They used their experience growing up close to farmland as the setting, including a grain silo as a place considered dangerous in their upbringing.

Beck and Woods began writing A Quiet Place in January 2016, and Krasinski read their initial script the following July. The concept of parents protecting their children appealed to Krasinski, especially as his second child with actress Emily Blunt had just been born, and Blunt encouraged him to direct the film. By March 2017, Paramount had bought Beck and Woods's script, and they hired Krasinski to rewrite the script and direct the film, which was his third directorial credit and his first for a major studio. Blunt did not want to be cast in the film, but she read the script on a plane flight and immediately told her husband, "I need to do it." He agreed, and they were both cast in the starring roles. After considering developing the film as a potential fourth installment in the Cloverfield franchise, Paramount and Krasinski decided that it would work better as a standalone film capable of forming an independent franchise.

Filming

Production took place from May to November 2017 in Dutchess and Ulster counties in upstate New York. Some filming took place on a soundstage in the town of Pawling in Dutchess County, as well as on-location in the county's city of Beacon. Filming also took place on the Wallkill Valley Rail Trail in New Paltz of Ulster County, using the Springtown Truss Bridge. Outside Dutchess and Ulster counties, filming took place on Main Street in Little Falls in Herkimer County, New York.

Sound and music
During filming, the crew avoided making noise so diegetic synchronized sounds (e.g., the sound of rolling dice on a game board) could be recorded; the sounds were amplified in post-production. A traditional musical score was also added, which Krasinski justified in wanting audiences to remain familiar with watching a mainstream film, and not feel like part of a "silence experiment."

Supervising sound editors Erik Aadahl and Ethan Van der Ryn worked on A Quiet Place. For scenes from the perspective of the deaf daughter, sound was removed to put greater focus on the visual. They also advised on organizing shots to reflect the creatures' perspective, like showing them noticing a sound, then showing what was causing the sound. Composer Marco Beltrami provided the sound editors music to work with in a way that would not interfere with the sound design throughout the film.

In the film, creatures are blind and communicate through clicking sounds. Aadahl and Van der Ryn said they were inspired by animal echolocation, such as that employed by bats. The sound of feedback, normally avoided by sound editors, was woven into the story at a loudness level that would not bother audiences too much.

Use of sign language
The characters communicate in American Sign Language (ASL) to avoid making sound, so the filmmakers hired deaf mentor Douglas Ridloff to teach ASL to the actors and to be available to make corrections. They also hired an ASL interpreter for deaf actress Simmonds, so that spoken and signed language could be interpreted back and forth on set. Simmonds grew up with ASL, and she helped teach her fellow actors to sign. She said, "In the movie, we've been signing together for years and years. So it should look fluent." She observed that each character's use of sign language reflected his or her motivations: the father had short and brief signs which showed his survival mentality, while the mother had more expressive signs as part of wanting her children to experience more than survival. Krasinski said that Simmonds's character used "signing that's very defiant, it's very teenage defiant."

Simmonds said that she suggested for the daughter to rebel rather than cower during a sign-language fight with her father. She also said that the script originally had the father sign "I love you" to his daughter at the end of the film, but she suggested for him to follow with "I've always loved you" to make up for their arguing earlier in the film.

Producers Andrew Form and Bradley Fuller said that they initially planned not to provide on-screen subtitles for sign-language dialogue while providing only "context clues," but they realized that subtitles were necessary for the scene in which the deaf daughter and her hearing father argue about the modified hearing aid. They subsequently added subtitles for all sign-language dialogue in the film.

Creature design
Production designer Jeffrey Beecroft headed the creature design, and Industrial Light & Magic created the creatures, led by visual effects supervisor Scott Farrar. The director wanted the creatures to look like they had evolved to no longer need eyes, and to be "somewhat humanoid" in nature. Farrar said the initial creature design showed them with rhinoceros-like horns out of their faces, later redesigned. Vanity Fair reported, "The team immediately set about pulling references; prehistoric fish, black snakes, and bats, particularly their movement patterns. Inspiration was also drawn from bog people: cadavers that have been mummified in peat, turning the skin black and giving it a sagging, leathery look." Krasinski provided motion-capture for the creatures.

Marketing
Paramount Pictures released the first trailer for A Quiet Place in November 2017. It aired a 30-second commercial for the film during the US football championship Super Bowl LII on February 4, 2018. Of the seven trailers that aired during the playoff, A Quiet Place and Red Sparrow were shown during the pregame and had the lowest views and social conversations. A Quiet Place had 149,000 views on YouTube, 275,000 views on Facebook, and 2,900 social conversations. On February 12, 2018, Krasinski appeared on The Ellen DeGeneres Show to present the full trailer for A Quiet Place. The studio spent an estimated $86 million on prints and advertisements for the film.

Release

Premiere
A Quiet Place had its world premiere at the South by Southwest film festival as the opening-night film on March 9, 2018. It was selected from 2,458 submissions, and earned "raves" from critics, according to IndieWire. Following its premiere, the film experienced social media growth to under  views across multiple platforms, outpacing Get Out (2017), which had  views.

Box office forecast
Deadline Hollywood said on  that the film was projected to gross around $20 million in its opening weekend.

The magazine said the film's trailer was well-received online and that it appeared frequently in previews for Star Wars: The Last Jedi. BoxOffice wrote, "The horror genre has also shown a knack for over-performing against expectations at the box office in recent years, setting this release up for potential success." It added that A Quiet Place would have to compete against another horror film, Truth or Dare, which would be released the following weekend. The magazine's staff drew "very favorable" comparisons between A Quiet Place and the 2016 films 10 Cloverfield Lane and Don't Breathe.

Theatrical run
A Quiet Place was first commercially released in theaters in the first week of April 2018 in multiple territories, including North America. The film grossed $188 million in the United States and Canada, and $152 million in other territories, for a worldwide total of $341 million. Deadline Hollywood estimates the net profit of the film to be $93 million, when factoring together all expenses and revenues.

The film made $18.9 million on its first day (including $4.3 million from Thursday night previews at ), increasing weekend projections to $47 million. Unlike most horror films, which are front-loaded on Friday and experience drops the rest of the weekend, A Quiet Place made $19.1 million on Saturday. It went on to debut to $50.2 million, topping the box office and marking the biggest opening for a Paramount film since Star Trek Beyond in July 2016.

The film made $32.9 million in its second weekend, dropping 34% (better than the 50+% that horror films normally see) and finishing second at the box office, behind newcomer Rampage ($35.7 million). The hold represented the second-best-ever second weekend for a scary movie behind It. The film regained the top spot the following week, grossing $20.9 million (a 36% drop), but dropped back down to second place the following weekend behind newcomer Avengers: Infinity War with $10.7 million.

Through its first two weeks of international release, the film had made $51.7 million, with its top markets being the United Kingdom ($9.2 million), Mexico ($5.1 million), Australia ($4.6 million), Brazil ($3.9 million), Indonesia ($3.4 million), the Philippines ($2.7 million) and Taiwan ($1.9 million). It also debuted to $2.2 million in Russia, the biggest-ever opening for a Paramount horror film in the country. In its third weekend overseas, it dipped only 37% for a total of $15 million from 57 markets. In its fourth weekend in international markets, it grossed $6.6 million. As of May 20, 2018, the film's largest markets were United Kingdom ($16.3 million), Australia ($9.3 million), Mexico ($7.5 million) and Brazil ($6.9 million). The film was released in China on May 18 and made $17.7 million from 8,731 screens in its opening weekend.

Reception

Critical response
The website's critical consensus reads: "A Quiet Place artfully plays on elemental fears with a ruthlessly intelligent creature feature that's as original as it is scary – and establishes director John Krasinski as a rising talent." On Metacritic, the film has a weighted average score of 82 out of 100, based on 55 critics, indicating "universal acclaim". Audiences polled by CinemaScore gave the film an average grade of "B+" on an A+ to F scale, while PostTrak reported filmgoers gave it an 81% overall positive score and a 63% "definite recommend".

Writing for Rolling Stone, Peter Travers gave the film 3.5 out of 4, praising the movie's exploration of themes about parenthood, and saying "This new horror classic will fry your nerves to a frazzle."

Varietys Owen Gleiberman said, "A Quiet Place is a tautly original genre-bending exercise, technically sleek and accomplished, with some vivid, scary moments, though it's a little too in love with the stoned logic of its own premise." Michael Phillips of the Chicago Tribune gave the film 2.5 out of 4 and said, "My favorite moment, an encounter between Regan and one of the monsters in a cornfield, plays with sound and image and tension, creatively. Other bits are more shameless...I don't know if I'd call A Quiet Place enjoyable; it's more grueling than cathartic."

Author Stephen King praised the film in a tweet, saying, "A QUIET PLACE is an extraordinary piece of work. Terrific acting, but the main thing is the SILENCE, and how it makes the camera's eye open wide in a way few movies manage." Nick Allen of RogerEbert.com called A Quiet Place "Krasinski's breakthrough as a triple-threat entertainer, but it's been a long time coming... By no accident, he's tackled the horror genre while relying on the unique strength that can be seen throughout his acting work, and one that has made him relatable as an everyman across TV and film—expressive silence."

Peter Bradshaw of The Guardian says: "In its simplicity and punch, this is a film that feels as if it could have been made decades ago, in the classic age of Planet of the Apes or The Omega Man. It is a cracking back-to-basics thriller that does not depend too much on what these creatures look like."

Matthew Monagle of Film School Rejects said A Quiet Place seemed to be "the early frontrunner for the sparsely intellectual horror movie of the year", like previous films The Babadook (2014) and The Witch (2015). Monagle said Krasinski, who had directed two previous films, was "making an unusual pivot into a genre typically reserved for newcomers", and considered it to be part of a movement toward horror films layered "in storytelling, [with] character beats not typically found in a horror movie". Tatiana Tenreyro, writing for Bustle, said while A Quiet Place was not a silent film, "It is the first of its kind within the modern horror genre for how little spoken dialogue it actually has." She said the rare moments of spoken dialogue "give depth to this horror movie, showing how the narrative defies the genre's traditional films even further".

Accolades

Commentary and themes

Parenthood
Krasinski identified the primary theme of the film as a dramatization of "fears associated with modern parenthood". Krasinski, who had recently become a father, said in a conference interview that he "was already in a state of terror about whether or not [he] was a good enough father", and added that the meaning of parenthood had been elevated for him by imagining being a father in a nightmare world, struggling to simply keep his children alive. Krasinski has told CBS News that "the scares were secondary to how powerful this could be as an allegory or metaphor for parenthood. For me, this is all about parenthood."

Travers' Rolling Stone review argued that "the question Krasinski tackles is what defines a family and what's needed to preserve it? 'Who are we', asks Mom, 'if we can't protect our children?' The answers are worked out with satisfying complexity and genuine feeling, proving indeed that home is where family is." The Hollywood Reporters John DeFore described the film as "a terrifying thriller with a surprisingly warm heart" and said, "you might have to go back to Jeff Nichols' 2011 Take Shelter to find a film that has used the fantastic this well to convey the combination of fear and responsibility a good parent feels".

Other themes
Speaking of the political and social commentary the film encouraged, Krasinski said, "That's not what I was going for, but the best compliment you can get on any movie is that it starts a conversation. The fact that people are leaving and talking about anything is really fun—but certainly about deep stuff like that, is awesome." Krasinski, who did not grow up with horror films, said that prior films of the genre such as Don't Breathe (2016) and Get Out (2017) that had societal commentary were part of his research. In addition to considering his film a metaphor for parenthood, he compared the premise to US politics in 2018, "I think in our political situation, that's what's going on now: You can close your eyes and stick your head in the sand, or you can try to participate in whatever's going on." He cited Jaws (1975) as an influence, with how the protagonist police officer moved from New York to an island to avoid frightening situations, and was forced to encounter one in his new location with shark attacks.

Roman Catholic Bishop Robert Barron was surprised by what he saw as strikingly religious themes in the film. He likened the family's primitive, agrarian life of silence to monasticism, and commends their self-giving love. Barron suggested pro-life themes, especially in the choices of the parents, as Mrs. Abbott risks everything to give birth to a child, and her husband lays down his own life so that the children can live: what Barron sees as the ultimate expression of parental love. Sonny Bunch of The Washington Post also commented and expanded on a pro-life message.

Richard Brody, writing for The New Yorker, criticized A Quiet Place for what he perceived to be the inclusion of conservative and pro-gun themes in the film. He described it as "the antithesis of 'Get Out'" and "both apparently unconscious and conspicuously regressive" and opined that it "[brings] to the fore the idealistic elements of gun culture while dramatizing the tragic implications that inevitably shadow that idealism." Krasinski addressed Brody's criticism in a subsequent interview with Esquire, stating that he did not write the film with an intentional political message. Krasinski said, "I never saw it that way or ever thought of it until it was presented to me in that way. [The film] wasn't about being, you know, silent and political... my whole metaphor was solely about parenthood."

Home media 
A Quiet Place was released on Digital HD on June 26, 2018, and on Ultra HD Blu-ray, Blu-ray and DVD on July 10, 2018.  Paramount Pictures released a 4K, Steelbook+Blu-Ray+Digital version of the film on February 25, 2020.

Sequel

A sequel to A Quiet Place, titled A Quiet Place Part II, was written and directed by Krasinski and stars Blunt, Simmonds, Jupe, Cillian Murphy, and Djimon Hounsou. Production took place in Western New York from June 2019 to September 2019. Paramount Pictures planned to release A Quiet Place Part II in theaters on March 20, 2020, however the film was rescheduled to September 4, 2020, due to the COVID-19 pandemic. It was delayed to April 2021 from July 2020, delayed again from September 2020 to January 2021, before being moved to May 28, 2021. The film would also be made available on Paramount+ 45 days after its theatrical release.

See also
 List of films featuring the deaf and hard of hearing
 List of horror films of 2018
 Sign-language media
 Disability in horror films

References

External links

 
 

A Quiet Place (film series)
2010s American films
2010s English-language films
2010s monster movies
2010s pregnancy films
2018 films
2018 horror films
Alien invasions in films
American monster movies
American post-apocalyptic films
American pregnancy films
American science fiction horror films
American Sign Language films
Apocalyptic films
Films about deaf people
Films about disability
Films about families
Films directed by John Krasinski
Films produced by Andrew Form
Films produced by Bradley Fuller
Films produced by Michael Bay
Films scored by Marco Beltrami
Films set in 2020
Films set in 2021
Films set in the future
Films set on farms
Films shot in New York (state)
Films using motion capture
Films with screenplays by John Krasinski
Paramount Pictures films
Platinum Dunes films